Congenital self-healing reticulohistiocytosis  is a condition that is a self-limited form of Langerhans cell histiocytosis.

Symptoms
Non-specific inflammatory response, which includes fever, lethargy, and weight loss. This is suspected of being a genetic disorder, and as the name implies, is self healing.

Skin: Commonly seen are a rash which varies from scaly erythematous lesions to red papules pronounced in intertriginous areas. Up to 80% of patients have extensive eruptions on the scalp. 
Lymph node: Enlargement of the lymph nodes in 50% of Histiocytosis cases.

Diagnosis

Treatment

History
It was first described by Ken Hashimoto and M. S. Pritzkar in 1973.

See also 
 List of cutaneous conditions
 X-type histiocytosis

References

External links 

Monocyte- and macrophage-related cutaneous conditions